South Windsor is a town in Hartford County, Connecticut, United States. The population was 26,918 at the 2020 census.

History
In 1659, Thomas Burnham (1617–1688) purchased the tract of land now covered by the towns of South Windsor and East Hartford from Tantinomo, chief sachem of the Podunk Indians.  Burnham lived on the land and later willed it to his nine children.  Beginning in the middle of the 17th century, a few settlers from Windsor began using land on the east bank of the Connecticut River for grazing and farming purposes. By 1700, a number of families had made their homes in the area. In 1768, the residents of the area were allowed to incorporate as the separate town of East Windsor, though the area was informally referred to as East Windsor before this time. At the time, the town included all of what is now the present-day towns of East Windsor, South Windsor, and Ellington. Known for its agriculture and ship building, the town of East Windsor, including South Windsor, supplied more than 200 volunteers during the American Revolution. In 1786, Ellington became an independent town, and South Windsor incorporated as a separate town in 1845. Tobacco has been a major crop grown in South Windsor since its founding.

(Old) Main Street, located near the Connecticut River and running north to south from the border of East Windsor to that of East Hartford, is the center of the town's historical district. The Wood Memorial Library & Museum and Ellsworth School are located on the street. Minister Timothy Edwards, the namesake of the town's middle school, is buried in a cemetery located on this street. In 1698, Edwards became the first minister for the settlers on the east side of the river, and his church was built on Main Street (in present-day South Windsor). His son, theologian Jonathan Edwards, was born in South Windsor (at the time still part of Windsor). Ulysses S. Grant stayed at a home on the street.

The town has become less and less agricultural and rural since 1950. This former farming community has been transformed into a suburban town with industrial and commercial districts. The town's population more than tripled between 1950 and 2000. In the early 1990s, residents mobilized a successful campaign against a proposed nuclear waste dump located near the East Windsor town line.

On the National Register of Historic Places

 East Windsor Hill Historic District – Roughly bounded by the Scantic River, John Fitch Boulevard, Sullivan Avenue, and the Connecticut River, added in 1986
 Elmore Houses – 78 and 87 Long Hill Road, added in 1985
 Windsor Farms Historic District – Roughly bounded by Strong Road, U.S. Route 5, Interstate 291, and the Connecticut River, added in 1986

Geography

Demographics

As of the census of 2000, there were 24,412 people, 8,905 households, and 6,767 families residing in the town. The racial makeup of the town was 85.95% White, 2% African American, 0.18% Native American, 3.71% Asian, 0.03% Pacific Islander, 0.66% from other races, and 0.96% from two or more races. Hispanic or Latino of any race were 2.27% of the population.

There were 8,905 households, out of which 38.5% had children under the age of 18 living with them, 65.7% were married couples living together, 7.5% had a female householder with no husband present, and 24.0% were non-families. 19.8% of all households were made up of individuals, and 6.9% had someone living alone who was 65 years of age or older.  The average household size was 2.72 and the average family size was 3.16.

In the town, the population was spread out, with 27.4% under the age of 18, 5.0% from 18 to 24, 29.7% from 25 to 44, 26.0% from 45 to 64, and 11.9% who were 65 years of age or older.  The median age was 39 years. For every 100 females, there were 93.0 males.  For every 100 females age 18 and over, there were 88.7 males.

The median income for a household in the town was $73,990, and the median income for a family was $82,807. Males had a median income of $55,703 versus $38,665 for females. The per capita income for the town was $30,966.  About 1.5% of families and 1.8% of the population were below the poverty line, including 0.8% of those under age 18 and 4.6% of those age 65 or over.

Economy

Top employers
Top employers in South Windsor according to the town's 2020 Comprehensive Annual Financial Report

Education
South Windsor Public Schools

Children attending the public school systems in South Windsor begin at the elementary school level (Kindergarten through Grade 5) at one of four elementary schools: Pleasant Valley, Orchard Hill, Philip R. Smith, and Eli Terry, with Wapping now used by the local recreation department, instead of previously running as a school. After graduating from elementary school, students then move on to Timothy Edwards Middle School, for grades 6–8.  They also have the choice to go to a magnet school, Two Rivers Magnet Middle School in East Hartford. They then finish up their schooling at South Windsor High School. Over 140 students in the 2004, 2005, and 2006 classes have been admitted to the University of Connecticut in Storrs.

Government and politics

Town council

South Windsor is governed by a council-manager form of government. The town manager is appointed by the town council and the leader of the council is designated as the mayor, with a deputy mayor also chosen from amongst the council.

The town council holds its elections every two years, on odd-numbered years. Each party nominates only up to six candidates for the nine town council positions (which are all at-large), and each voter may only vote for up to six candidates from the pool of all candidates nominated by all parties. The top nine vote-getters win seats on the town council; as a result the council always has a 5–4 or 6–3 majority (assuming only two parties are participating), ensuring representation of the minority party.

Voting

Notable people

 Israel Bissell (1752–1823), post rider, rode from Lexington to Philadelphia to warn about the British
 Nancy Caffyn (1934–2010), politician
 Marcus Camby (born 1974), National Basketball Association player
 Chris Clark (born 1976), former National Hockey League player
 Michael Donnelly (1959–2005), Gulf War veteran and activist
 Jonathan Edwards (1703–1758), theologian
 Timothy Edwards (1669–1758), clergyman, namesake of Timothy Edwards Middle School
 John Fitch (1743–1798), inventor
 Will Friedle (born 1976), actor, voice actor and comedian
 Alex Grossi (born 1976), guitarist for the rock band Quiet Riot
 Jack Hathaway (born 1982), astronaut, one of the 10 candidates selected as part of NASA Astronaut Group 23
 Romil Hemnani (born 1995), musician, member of hip hop group Brockhampton
 Deborah Dillon Lightfoot (1956–2007), wheelchair athlete; National Wheelchair Basketball Hall of Fame
 Brent Morin (born 1986), actor/comedian (Undateable)
 Paul Pasqualoni (born 1949), former head coach of the University of Connecticut football team
 Jeff Porcaro (1954–1992), member of rock band Toto
 Mike Porcaro (1955–2015), member of rock band Toto
 Steve Porcaro (born 1957), member of rock band Toto
 Brian Sullivan, ice hockey player
 Eli Terry (1772–1852), clockmaker, inventor
 Oliver Wolcott (1726–1797), signer of the Declaration of Independence
 Houman Younessi (1963–2016), scientist

References

External links

Town of South Windsor official website
South Windsor Historical Society
South Windsor, Connecticut, at City-Data.com

 
Towns in Hartford County, Connecticut
Connecticut populated places on the Connecticut River
Towns in Connecticut
Greater Hartford